Paul Meng may refer to:

Paul Meng Qinglu (born 1962), Chinese Roman Catholic bishop in Inner Mongolia
Paul Meng Zhuyou (born 1963), Chinese Roman Catholic bishop in Taiyuan